The China Railways YJ (Chinese: 跃进; pinyin: Yuè Jìn; lit. 'leap forward') design is based on China Railways PL2 class 2-6-2, itself derived from the JF6 2-8-2, the predecessor of the well known SY class mikado. According to Chinese sources a total of 202 locos were produced between 1958 and 1961.

At least two YJs are preserved. YJ 232 is at Baotou Steelworks, YJ 269 is at Diaobingshan, Tiefa, Liaoning.

See also 
China Railways JF6
China Railways SY
China Railways PL2

References 

Railway locomotives introduced in 1958
Standard gauge locomotives of China
2-6-2 locomotives
Steam locomotives of China
Freight locomotives